Railbanking is the act of preserving railroad rights-of-way for possible future use. Railbanking leaves the rail corridor, railbed, bridges or bridge right-of-way, and other infrastructure intact. This relieves the railroad's operator from the responsibility of maintenance, and from taxation. Existing rails may or may not be maintained intact on the railbed, depending on their condition or any planned interim use of the railbed. Often the rail corridor is put in custody of a state transportation agency, which then seeks a new operator for possible rehabilitation or reactivation. This helps ensure the possibility of future restored rail service when new economic conditions may warrant resuming operation.

In the United States
In places with many environmental laws and other governmental regulations as the United States, it is very difficult to restore an abandoned line, but it is easier with a railbanked line than one that has undergone a "total abandonment", as the federal government guarantees the railroad the full rights to reactivate it. A railbanked line can be reopened within a year's time while an abandoned corridor could take years to be reactivated, if it was even possible. In railbanking, the government helps fund the line's rebuild. In the 25-year period from 1983 to 2008,  of railroad have been abandoned. Of that, representing 56.8% of the lines abandoned in the past 25 years, were originally negotiated for railbanking agreements.

Twenty-one percent of those railbanking agreements failed; that is, they were ultimately abandoned. Of those  originally negotiated,  actually reached a railbanking agreement, representing 35.8% of the lines abandoned during the 25-year period. The remaining 43.2% of the lines, representing , were lines that railroads never considered trying to have railbanked, and were abandoned in their entirety. In total,  of the  abandoned during the 25-year period were not railbanked (64.2%). Some railroads refuse to railbank lines, and instead sell the land in parcels to the surrounding landowners.

Since railbanking began in 1983, nine railbanked corridors have been approved for reactivation by the Surface Transportation Board (STB). Some of these reactivated corridors had only short sections reactivated, while others had the entire corridor reactivated. Two of these approved have not yet been reopened, though both are in the process (as of March 2010). Railbanked corridors are usually utilized as multi-use recreational trails for cyclists, walkers, joggers, snowmobiling, cross country skiing, and horseback riding.

The land over which railways pass may have many owners—private, rail operator, or governmental—and, depending on the terms under which it was originally acquired, the type of operating rights may also vary. Without railbanking, on closure, some parts of a railway's route might otherwise revert to the former owner. The owner could reuse them for any purpose, or modify the ground conditions, potentially prejudicing the line's future reuse if required. However, the landowner must agree to keep the infrastructure such as bridges and tunnels intact.

Approximately 85% of the railroad rights-of-way in the United States were acquired by easement from the then-abutting property owners. Normally, when the use for an easement is abandoned, the easement is extinguished and the land is not burdened by this adverse use. In 1983, Congress passed what is now known as the federal Rails-To-Trails law codified as 16 U.S.C. 1247(d). The federal law took the property rights of property owners throughout the United States for rail trails. Several property owners sued the government as the law took property without compensation. In 1990, the United States Supreme Court ruled that the property owners were entitled to compensation for the land taken for these rail trails. In 1996, the plaintiff was awarded $1.5 million as compensation for the land taken for a trail through his property (see Preseault v. U.S., 100 F3d 1525, Fed. Cir. [1996]).

The state of Connecticut has taken a proactive approach to preserving railway rights-of-way. Since the 1970s, Connecticut Department of Transportation policy has been to acquire abandoned rail lines for preservation. This has contributed to the majority of railroad mileage in Connecticut being publicly owned, between the state and Amtrak. Today, this policy continues; the State will purchase any RoW that shows future potential for transportation, when the property becomes available. CDOT has subsequently transferred 60 miles of RoW to the Connecticut Department of Energy and Environmental Protection for use in rail trails, and CDEEP itself has independently obtained another 50 miles (22 of which are used for the Valley Railroad). A provision of this transfer is that CDOT is allowed to retake ownership of a right-of-way when needed for transportation purposes. Because of this, Connecticut is one of the only states where railbanked corridors have a reasonable chance of reactivation (should there be a need to), where elsewhere local opposition from trail users and property abutters would be able to directly influence a municipally-owned right-of-way.

Often, most of or all infrastructure is removed regardless to future use. Laws have been passed to remove infrastructure, in some cases. For example, in the Commonwealth of Pennsylvania, a law was made to remove all unused railroad overpasses. Another example is a natural disaster. If a flood washes away a railbanked railroad bridge, that is beyond the owner's control. The local, state, and Federal governments could give some financial help for the railroad to rebuild any infrastructure that may have been damaged or destroyed during the time that it was unused.

A single section of a route changed in this way could have serious consequences for the viability of a restoration of a service, with the costs of repurchasing the land or right-of-way or of restoring the site to its former condition outweighing the economic benefit. Over the full length of a railway's route with many different owners, the reopening costs could be considerable. In 2017 the STB ruled that Neosho County in Kansas violated the Trails Act when it foreclosed on and sold three parcels of railbanked land where each spanned the full width of the right-of-way. The county's sales of the parcels were preempted by federal law and were vacated to keep the rail line available for reactivation.

By designating the route as railbanked, these complications are avoided and the costs of maintaining a right-of-way are removed from the railway operator. In the United States, land transferred to rail banks is held by local, state or federal governments and many railbanked rail corridors have been reused as trails.

In the United Kingdom 
In the United Kingdom, thousands of miles (kilometers) of railway were closed under the Beeching Axe cuts in the 1960s and while several of these routes have subsequently been reopened, none were formally treated as land banks in the US manner. The Beeching closures were driven by the government's desire to reduce expenditure on railways, and so most lines were offered for sale to the highest bidder, a process which frequently led to great fragmentation in the ownership of former UK railway lines and reuse of the land for entirely different purposes. The Ryle Telescope on the former OxfordCambridge Varsity Line is possibly the most extreme example, but commercial and residential developments are common.

See also 
 Rail trail

References 

Railway Lands